The Hungary women's junior national handball team is the national under-19 handball team of Hungary. Controlled by the Hungarian Handball Federation it represents the country in international matches.

History

World Championship
 Champions   Runners up   Third place   Fourth place

*Gold background color indicates that the tournament was won.
**Red border color indicates tournament was held on home soil.

European Championship
 Champions   Runners up   Third place   Fourth place

*Red border color indicates tournament was held on home soil.

Coaches
 Antal Berendi (−1998)
Péter Kovács (1998–2003)
 László Kovács (2003)
 Eszter Mátéfi (2005–2007)
 János Hajdu (2007, 2013–2014, 2017)
 Kálmán Róth (2008–2010, 2011–2012)
 János Gyurka (2010–2011)
ifj. Szilárd Kiss / György Papp (2015–2016)
 Vladimir Golovin (2018–2021)
ifj. Szilárd Kiss (2021–2022)
Zoltán Szilágyi (2022–present)

Previous teams

2022 World Championship Team
Team
Goalkeepers: Anna Bukovszky, Dalma Christe, Panna Zsigmond
Left wings: Maja Mérai, Míra Vámos
Left backs: Borbála Ballai, Borbála Besszer, Gréta Juhász, Petra Koronczai, Zsófia Mlinkó
Centre backs: Anna Kukely, Johanna Farkas, Blanka Kajdon
Right backs: Diána Ferenczy
Right wings: Lilla Csáki, Tamara Vártok
Line players: Luca Faragó, Dorottya Kiss, Lilly Török
Staff
Head coach: ifj. Szilárd Kiss

2018 World Champion Team
Team
Goalkeepers: Sára Suba, Boglárka Binó, Petra Hlogyik
Left wings: Gréta Márton, Csenge Fodor
Left backs: Noémi Háfra, Gréta Kácsor, Laura Horváth
Centre backs: Rita Lakatos, Kitti Szabó, Bernadett Hornyák
Right backs: Katrin Klujber, Laura Pénzes
Right wings: Dorottya Faluvégi, Bettina Kuti
Line players: Noémi Pásztor, Petra Tóvizi, Laura Giricz
Staff
Head coach: Vladimir Golovin
Assistant coach: Krisztina Pigniczki
Goalkeeping coach: Béla Bartalos

2017 European Championship team (3. place)
Team
Goalkeepers: Boglárka Binó, Petra Hlogyik, Sára Suba
Left wings: Csenge Fodor, Gréta Márton
Left backs: Noémi Háfra, Bernadett Hornyák, Anette Emma Hudák
Centre backs: Dorina Román, Kitti Szabó
Right backs: Katrin Klujber
Right wings: Dorottya Faluvégi, Bettina Kuti
Line players: Laura Giricz, Noémi Pásztor, Petra Tóvizi
Staff
Head coach: János Hajdu
Assistant coach: Krisztina Pigniczki

2016 World Championship team (10. place)
Team
Goalkeepers: Nóra Gercsó, Kitti Mistina, Alexa Wéninger
Left wings: Szidónia Puhalák
Left backs: Fanni Gerháth, Orsolya Monori
Centre backs: Fruzsina Bouti, Fruzsina Ferenczy, Konszuéla Hámori, Gabriella Tóth
Right backs: Beatrix Élő
Right wings: Flóra Katona, Dorottya Faluvégi
Line players: Laura Szabó, Panna Gindeli, Zsanett Pintér
Staff
Head coach: Ifj. Szilárd Kiss
Assistant coach: György Papp

2015 European Championship team (4. place)
Team
Goalkeepers: Nóra Gercsó, Kitti Mistina
Left wings: Júlia Hársfalvi
Left backs: Fanni Gerháth, Petra Horváth, Dóra Kemény, Orsolya Monori
Centre backs: Fruzsina Bouti, Fruzsina Ferenczy, Konszuéla Hámori
Right backs: Anita Csala, Beatrix Élő
Right wings: Nikolett Diószegi, Dorottya Faluvégi
Line players: Noémi Pásztor, Zsanett Pintér
Staff
Head coach: Ifj. Szilárd Kiss
Assistant coach: György Papp

2014 World Championship team (7. place)
Team
Goalkeepers: Blanka Bíró, Annamária Ferenczi, Zsófi Szemerey
Left wings: Vanessza Hajtai, Dorina Korsós
Left backs: Krisztina Bárány, Kitti Gyimesi, Mercédesz Walfisch
Centre backs: Ivett Kurucz, Gabriella Tóth, Noémi Virág
Right backs: Luca Szekerczés
Right wings: Viktória Lukács, Krisztina Májer
Line players: Luca Dombi, Rea Mészáros, Szederke Sirián
Staff
Head coach: János Hajdu

2013 European Championship team (2. place)
Team
Goalkeepers: Blanka Bíró, Annamária Ferenczi, Zsófi Szemerey
Left wings: Nikolett Buzsáki, Dorina Korsós, Zsófia Szondi
Left backs: Krisztina Bárány, Dóra Ivanics, Mercédesz Walfisch
Centre backs: Ivett Kurucz, Gabriella Tóth, Noémi Virág
Right backs: Éva Schneider, Luca Szekerczés
Right wings: Viktória Lukács
Line players: Rea Mészáros, Szederke Sirián
Staff
Head coach: János Hajdu

2012 World Championship team (3. place)
Team
Goalkeepers: Blanka Bíró, Regina Hrankai, Bettina Pásztor
Left wings: Szonja Gávai, Orsolya Pelczéder, Nadine Schatzl
Left backs: Dóra Horváth, Kinga Klivinyi, Pálma Siska
Centre backs: Vivien Kuhinkó, Fruzsina Takács, Eszter Tóth
Right backs: Szimonetta Planéta
Right wings: Nelli Such
Line players: Fruzsina Palkó, Bianka Takács
Staff
Head coach: Kálmán Róth
Assistant coach: Vlagyimir Golovin

2011 European Championship team (14. place)
Team
Goalkeepers: Regina Hrankai, Annamária Kurucz, Bettina Pásztor
Left wings: Szonja Gávai, Nadine Schatzl
Left backs: Dóra Hornyák, Kinga Klivinyi, Pálma Siska
Centre backs: Barbara Kopecz, Gréta Kovács, Vivien Kuhinkó
Right backs: Szimonetta Planéta, Luca Szekerczés
Right wings: Nelli Such
Line players: Melitta Kaiser, Fruzsina Palkó
Staff
Head coach: János Gyurka
Assistant coach: Vlagyimir Golovin

2010 World Championship team (5. place)
Team
Goalkeepers: Kinga Janurik, Viktória Oguntoye, Vivien Víg
Left wings: Babett Szalai, Krisztina Turcsányi
Left backs: Dóra Deáki, Gyöngyi Drávai, Vivien Léránt
Centre backs: Bettina Dajka, Anikó Kovacsics
Right backs: Dóra Hornyák, Anna Kovács
Right wings: Boglárka Hosszu, Krisztina Tamás
Line players: Bernadett Horváth, Anett Kisfaludy
Staff
Head coach: Kálmán Róth
Assistant coach: Gábor Danyi

2009 European Championship silver medalist team
Team
Goalkeepers: Kinga Janurik, Vivien Víg
Left wings: Babett Szalai, Krisztina Turcsányi
Left backs: Szandra Zácsik, Dóra Deáki, Gyöngyi Drávai, Vivien Léránt
Centre backs: Anikó Kovacsics, Bettina Dajka, Tímea Szögi
Right backs: Dóra Hornyák
Right wings: Krisztina Tamás, Boglárka Hosszu
Line players: Bernadett Horváth, Anett Kisfaludy
Staff
Head coach: Kálmán Róth
Assistant coach: Gábor Danyi
Goalkeeping coach: Béla Bartalos

2008 World Championship team (5. place)
Team
Goalkeepers: Hajnalka Futaki, Vivien Víg
Left wings: Viktória Fehér, Patrícia Szölösi, Krisztina Turcsányi
Left backs: Dóra Deáki, Gyöngyi Drávai, Vivien Léránt
Centre backs: Bettina Dajka, Anikó Kovacsics
Right backs: Dóra Hornyák
Right wings: Krisztina Tamás
Line players: Krisztina Gulya, Bernadett Horváth, Anett Kisfaludy
Staff
Head coach: Kálmán Róth
Assistant coach: Gábor Danyi

2007 European Championship team (8. place)
Team
Goalkeepers: Hajnalka Futaki, Andrea Kószó, Brigitta Trimmel
Left wings: Szilvia Gerstmár, Anita Kazai
Left backs: Dóra Deáki, Gyöngyi Drávai, Míra Emberovics
Centre backs: Kitti Kudor, Tamara Tilinger
Right backs: Adrienn Kovács, Zsófia Lévai
Right wings: Kata Földes, Dorottya Kolos
Line players: Anita Cifra, Szabina Mayer
Staff
Head coach: János Hajdu

2005 World Championship team (4. place)
Team
Goalkeepers: Kitti Hoffmann, Annamária Király, Ágnes Triffa
Left wings: Anett Belső, Gabriella Juhász
Left backs: Eszter Laluska, Zsuzsanna Tomori
Centre backs: Renáta Gerstmár, Olívia Kamper, Szabina Tápai, Bernadett Temes
Right backs: Anett Sopronyi
Right wings: Bernadett Bódi, Viktória Csáki
Line players: Barbara Balogh, Piroska Szamoránsky
Staff
Head coach: Eszter Mátéfi
Assistant coach: Éva Szarka

2003 World Championship team (2. place)
Team
Goalkeepers: Orsolya Herr, Viktória Petróczi
Left wings: Gabriella Juhász, Edina Orosz, Orsolya Simon, Melinda Vincze
Left backs: Anita Bulath, Katalin Jenőfi, Renáta Mörtel, Gabriella Szűcs
Centre backs: Adrienn Blaskovits, Olívia Kamper
Right backs: 
Right wings: Bernadett Bódi, Renáta Kári Horváth
Line players: Mariann Sütő, Valéria Szabó
Staff
Head coach: László Kovács
Assistant coach: Éva Feketéné Kovács

2002 European Championship team (2. place)
Team
Goalkeepers: Orsolya Herr, Viktória Petróczi, Gabriella Tamaskovics
Left wings: Edina Orosz, Orsolya Simon, Melinda Vincze
Left backs: Anita Bulath, Katalin Jenőfi, Renáta Mörtel, Gabriella Szűcs
Centre backs: Adrienn Blaskovits, Ágnes Kocsis
Right backs: 
Right wings: Bernadett Bódi, Renáta Kári Horváth
Line players: Valéria Szabó, Katalin Szórádi
Staff
Head coach: Péter Kovács
Assistant coach: Éva Feketéné Kovács

2001 World Championship team (2. place)
Team
Goalkeepers: Melinda Pastrovics, Viktória Petróczi
Left wings: Zsuzsanna Gálhidi, Ivett Nagy, Orsolya Vérten
Left backs: Anita Bulath, Hortenzia Szrnka, Mária Tóth
Centre backs: Anita Görbicz, Nóra Jókai
Right backs: Ibolya Mehlmann, Adrienn Őri
Right wings: Melinda Berta, Renáta Kári Horváth
Line players: Adrienn Gaál, Cecília Őri
Staff
Head coach: Péter Kovács
Assistant coach: Éva Szarka

2000 European Championship team (8. place)
Team
Goalkeepers: Melinda Pastrovics, Viktória Petróczi, Tímea Varga
Left wings: Zsuzsanna Gálhidi, Ivett Nagy, Orsolya Vérten
Left backs: Hortenzia Szrnka, 
Centre backs: Anita Görbicz, Nóra Jókai
Right backs: Ibolya Mehlmann, Adrienn Őri
Right wings: Mónika Grezner, Nóra Povázsay
Line players: Adrienn Gaál, Cecília Őri
Staff
Head coach: Péter Kovács
Assistant coach: Péter Őri

1999 World Championship team (4. place)
Team
Goalkeepers: Piroska Bartek, Edina Juhász, Katalin Lancz
Left wings: Krisztina Hajdu, Viktória Koroknai, Andrea Lőw
Left backs: Judit Csíkos, Gabriella Kindl, Hortenzia Szrnka
Centre backs: Judit Pőcze, Edina Rábai, Szilvia Szőke
Right backs: Beatrix Benyáts
Right wings: Ágnes Turtóczki
Line players: Rita Borbás, Katalin Borkowska
Staff
Head coach: Péter Kovács
Assistant coach: Péter Őri

1998 European Championship team (6. place)
Team
Goalkeepers: Piroska Bartek, Edina Juhász, Katalin Lancz
Left wings: Krisztina Hajdu
Left backs: Judit Csíkos, Gabriella Kindl, Hortenzia Szrnka
Centre backs: Tímea Császár, Judit Pőcze
Right backs: Beatrix Benyáts
Right wings: Ágnes Turtóczki
Line players: Katalin Borkowska, Adrienn Gaál
Other players: Andrea Pöltl
Staff
Head coach: Antal Berendi

1997 World Championship team (10. place)
Team
Goalkeepers: Orsolya Kurucz, Katalin Pálinger, Tímea Sugár
Left wings: Fanni Kenyeres, Anett Köbli, Dóra Lőwy
Left backs: 
Centre backs: Bernadett Ferling, Eszter Siti
Right backs: Nikolett Brigovácz, Krisztina Nagy
Right wings: 
Line players: 
Other players: Mariann Becz, Enikő Krista, Barbara Németh, Krisztina Orosz, Bea Szilágyi
Staff
Head coach: Antal Berendi

See also
 Hungary women's national handball team
 Hungary women's national youth handball team

References

External links

Women's national junior handball teams
Women's handball in Hungary
Women's national sports teams of Hungary